Echidnocephalus troscheli is an extinct, prehistoric halosaur.  Fossils are found from Campanian strata of Westphalia, Germany.  The complete and incomplete fossil specimens that have been found suggest an animal already looking very much like modern halosaurs.

See also

 Laytonia, a Miocene genus of fossil halosaur
 Prehistoric fish
 List of prehistoric bony fish

References

Late Cretaceous fish
Halosauridae
Fossils of Germany